The men's 61 kg competition at the 2019 World Weightlifting Championships was held on 18 and 19 September 2019.

Schedule

Medalists

Records

Results

New records

References

Results 

Men's 61 kg